Ana Mercado (born , in Tepic) is a retired Mexican female volleyball player. She was part of the Mexico women's national volleyball team.

At the 2005 Women's Pan-American Volleyball Cup in Santo Domingo, Dominican Republic, Mercado was awarded for the best server. She scored during the tournament 25 serving aces and she still holds (as of 2015) the Pan American Cup record for most serving aces. She was selected as the most valuable player in the 2005 American Midwest Conference.

Mercado studied at the Missouri Baptist University.

Palmares
2005
7th: 2005 Women's Pan-American Volleyball Cup
7th: 2005 Women's NORCECA Volleyball Championship
2006
4th: 2006 Central American and Caribbean Games
9th: 2006 Women's Pan-American Volleyball Cup

Awards
 2005 Women's Pan-American Volleyball Cup - best server
 2005 American Midwest Conference - most valuable player

References

1983 births
Living people
Mexican women's volleyball players
People from Tepic